Lynne Wilson (born 5 January 1969) is a British swimmer. She competed in the women's 200 metre butterfly at the 1988 Summer Olympics.

References

External links
 

1969 births
Living people
British female swimmers
Olympic swimmers of Great Britain
Swimmers at the 1988 Summer Olympics
Sportspeople from Sunderland
Female butterfly swimmers
20th-century British women